Mohammad Umair (born 31 October 1994) is a Pakistani first-class cricketer. He made his List A debut for Zarai Taraqiati Bank Limited in the 2018–19 Quaid-e-Azam One Day Cup on 6 September 2018.

References

External links
 

1994 births
Living people
Pakistani cricketers
Zarai Taraqiati Bank Limited cricketers
Place of birth missing (living people)
Southern Punjab (Pakistan) cricketers